Inferno (alias Sandy Anderson of the planet Earth) is a superheroine in the DC Comics universe. The character is a former ally of the Legion of Super-Heroes in the future, but currently resides in the present day.

Fictional character biography
The name "Sandy Anderson" first appeared when several Legionnaires, including Inferno, were placed in an illusionary world representing rural 1950s America where, among other things, all their names were anglicized  to names which that might existed then (for instance, Querl Dox became "Earl Docks"), making it unclear whether that is her name or whether it is just a close approximation. The Inferno miniseries from 1997-1998 has her refer to Sandy as her name and shows a flashback where she is called Ms. Anderson, establishing this as her actual name. Her parents are named John Anderson and Maja Will Anderson.

As depicted in the post-Zero Hour reimagining of the LSH storyline, Inferno is depicted as a rather bloodthirsty character who initially works for a group called the Workforce. She works alongside Live Wire after he resigns from the Legion. As a member of the Workforce, she is shown killing opponents by immolating them, much to the chagrin of Legion members.

She was part of the Legion group and was sent to the 20th century by the Emerald Eye. She assists with battling the Sun-Eater, as detailed in The Final Night #1-4. Later, not feeling any affiliation to the Legion, she elected to remain there when the others returned to the 30th century.

There, she spent some time affiliated with a strange shopping mall and several homeless teenagers. During this time, she had to deal with the problem of unwittingly moving locations while asleep. She was later recruited to be part of the invading force sent to Zandia to avenge the murder of the parents of the Empress. The force was made up of many other young superheroes, including Damage, the Wonder Twins, and Young Justice.

Inferno has not appeared in the original Legion continuity, although she may have been based on a character named Beauty Blaze who was created for the Legion of Super-Villains, but ultimately unused.

In Mark Waid's rebooted Legion, Inferno is a member of a group called the Wanderers, a "black ops" group of adult heroes who oppose the Legion because they won't take orders. The rebooted Inferno comes from Mercury and has green skin.

Bibliography
 Inferno #1-4 (DC Comics, October 1997 - February 1998)
 JLA: World Without Grown Ups #1
 Legion of Super-Heroes (vol. 4) #64-65, 72, 83-96
 Legionnaires #21-22, 26, 39-40, 47
 Teen Titans (vol. 2) #17

External links
A Hero History Of Inferno

Comics characters introduced in 1995
DC Comics female superheroes
DC Comics superheroes